Àngel Guimerà is a metro station of the Metrovalencia network in Valencia, Spain. It is situated on Carrer d'Àngel Guimerà, named after the writer Àngel Guimerà, in the southwestern part of the city centre. The station is an underground structure.

Railway stations in Spain opened in 1988
Metrovalencia stations